Svilen Piralkov (born 8 April 1975) is a Spanish water polo player who competed in the 2008 Summer Olympics.

See also
 List of World Aquatics Championships medalists in water polo

References

External links
 

1975 births
Living people
Spanish male water polo players
Olympic water polo players of Spain
Water polo players at the 2008 Summer Olympics
World Aquatics Championships medalists in water polo
21st-century Spanish people